The list of shipwrecks in 1921 includes ships sunk, foundered, grounded, or otherwise lost during 1921.

January

2 January

3 January

5 January

6 January

7 January

9 January

10 January

12 January

15 January

16 January

17 January

18 January

19 January

20 January

22 January

24 January

25 January

26 January

28 January

29 January

31 January

Unknown date

February

1 February

2 February

3 February

6 February

7 February

8 February

9 February

11 February

12 February

13 February

14 February

15 February

16 February

17 February

19 February

21 February

24 February

26 February

27 February

28 February

Unknown date

March

2 March

3 March

4 March

5 March

7 March

8 March

9 March

10 March

12 March

13 March

14 March

18 March

21 March

28 March

31 March

Unknown date

April

1 April

2 April

3 April

9 April

11 April

13 April

14 April

15 April

16 April

18 April

20 April

21 April

22 April

23 April

27 April

28 April

29 April

30 April

May

1 May

3 May

4 May

5 May

6 May

12 May

13 May

14 May

16 May

20 May

23 May

24 May

26 May

27 May

28 May

30 May

31 May

June

1 June

2 June

3 June

4 June

6 June

7 June

9 June

10 June

13 June

16 June

20 June

21 June

22 June

23 June

24 June

26 June

27 June

28 June

30 June

July

1 July

4 July

6 July

7 July

8 July

9 July

11 July

12 July

13 July

15 July

16 July

18 July

19 July

21 July

22 July

23 July

25 July

29 July

31 July

August

1 August

2 August

3 August

4 August

6 August

7 August

8 August

9 August

10 August

12 August

13 August

14 August

15 August

16 August

17 August

19 August

20 August

22 August

23 August

26 August

29 August

September

2 September

3 September

4 September

5 September

7 September

8 September

10 September

12 September

15 September

16 September

17 September

18 September

19 September

21 September

22 September

26 September

27 September

28 September

29 September

30 September

October

2 October

3 October

4 October

5 October

7 October

8 October

9 October

12 October

13 October

14 October

15 October

16 October

17 October

19 October

20 October

23 October

24 October

25 October

26 October

27 October

28 October

31 October

Unknown date

November

1 November

2 November

3 November

4 November

5 November

6 November

7 November

9 November

11 November

13 November

14 November

15 November

17 November

20 November

21 November

23 November

24 November

25 November

28 November

29 November

30 November

Unknown date

December

1 December

2 December

3 December

4 December

5 December

7 December

8 December

9 December

10 December

12 December

13 December

14 December

15 December

16 December

19 December

21 December

24 December

25 December

26 December

27 December

28 December

30 December

31 December

Unknown date

References

1921
 
Ships